Ptochiomera is a genus of dirt-colored seed bugs in the family Rhyparochromidae. There are at least two described species in Ptochiomera.

Species
These two species belong to the genus Ptochiomera:
 Ptochiomera chilensis (Spinola, 1852)
 Ptochiomera nodosa Say, 1831

References

External links

 

Rhyparochromidae
Articles created by Qbugbot